The Royal Bombay Yacht Club (RBYC) is one of the premier gentlemens' clubs which was founded in 1846 in Colaba (formerly Wellington Pier), an area of Mumbai in India. The building was designed by John Adams, who also designed the nearby Royal Alfred Sailors' Homes (now the Maharashtra Police Headquarters), and was completed in 1896.

The club offers chambers for residence overlooking the Gateway of India, a bar, a lounge, a restaurant, ballrooms, a club shop, a library, and members sleeping room, in addition to sailing facilities in the Arabian Sea. 

The club regularly conducts sailing events and championships for members and sailors. Admission to the club is reserved by exclusive membership.

History

The Bombay Yacht Club was founded in 1846 with Henry Morland as club commodore and 30 years later, on the recommendation of Sir Philip Edmond Wodehouse, Queen Victoria permitted it to add the word Royal to its name.

The seafront clubhouse was built in 1881 and received a number of prominent visitors within its first ten years, including Prince Arthur, Duke of Connaught and Strathearn and his wife, Princess Louise Margaret of Prussia, and the railroad tycoon and yachting enthusiast William Kissam Vanderbilt – part owner of the 1895 America's Cup winner, the 37.5m sloop Defender.

In 1894, the Commissioners of the Lord High Admiral of the United Kingdom bestowed upon the club a Blue Ensign with a Star of India surmounted by the Imperial Crown of India.

Another clubhouse was built in 1896, a blending of Venetian Gothic architecture with Indian Saracenic, to provide accommodations for members and visiting associates.

In 1958, the Bombay Club was closed for not accepting Indian members. The RBYC granted honorary memberships to all Bombay Club members and provided a new home for their furniture and other effects.

The 1960s saw a new race introduced after the late Prince Philip, Duke of Edinburgh visited the club and presented the Challenge Cup for a Combined Class race not less than 21 miles. The RBYC at that time owned a fleet of four 21-foot Seabird Half Raters, whilst its members’ owned boats including the Chindwin (Bermudian cutter), the Iona (a Gunter sloop), the Silver Oak (a Yachting World keel boat), the Tir (a yawl), the Merope (Stor-Draken class) and the Griffon and the Wynvern (two International Dragons). The club was selected to host the 6th National Regatta for the Yachting Association of India.

Member Philip Bragg, who built the Suhaili, the first yacht to sail solo non-stop around the world, died in 1984. Yachtsman Sir Robin Knox-Johnson attended a reception in his honour at the club in 2004.

In 2006, the club was visited by the First Sea Lord, Admiral Sir Jonathon Band and his wife, Lady Sarah Band, as well as other senior officers of the visiting Fleet. This was shortly followed by a visit from Sir Jock Stirrup, the Air Chief Marshal of the Royal Air Force and Chief of the Defence Staff. In 2010, General Sir Michael Rose visited.

In 2013 the Royal Bombay Yacht Club Residential Chambers received an award of merit in the 2013 UNESCO Asia-Pacific Heritage Awards.

See also 

List of India's gentlemen's clubs
 Royal Madras Yacht Club

References 

 The Founding of the Bombay Yacht Club by Kerse Naoroji
 City guide — Maharashtra — Mumbai — Places of Interest
 Oldest International Yacht Clubs

External links 

 Club website
 The Haven That Is The Royal Bombay Yacht Club

Royal yacht clubs
1846 establishments in British India
Bombay
Buildings and structures in Mumbai
Sports clubs in Mumbai
Sports clubs established in 1846